The 1924 Argentine Primera División was the 33rd season of top-flight football in Argentina. The AFA season began on April 13 and ended on January 4, 1925; while the AAmF began on April 6 and ended on February 15, 1925.

Final tables

Asociación Argentina de Football - Copa Campeonato

Club Atlético Sportsman made its debut in Primera División.

Asociación Amateur de Football

Club Atlético Liberal Argentino made its debut in Primera División.

References

Argentine Primera División seasons
1924 in Argentine football
1924 in South American football